Catherine Tate's Nan (simply referred to as Nan on-screen) is a BBC One spin-off series of specials which follows the character of Joanie Taylor (Catherine Tate) from the original sketch comedy series The Catherine Tate Show. When the initial series ended in 2007, a Christmas Special was broadcast in 2009, Nan's Christmas Carol, which is now established as the first episode of the Nan specials, and was followed by three subsequent specials in 2014 and 2015 under the title Nan.

Cast

Main cast
 Catherine Tate as Joanie Taylor (episodes 1–4)

Supporting cast

Episodes

Availability

Home media
Nan's Christmas Carol (as 'The Catherine Tate Show: Nan's Xmas Carol') was released on Region 2 DVD in the United Kingdom via 2 Entertain on 29 November 2010. The special, which is now established as the first episode of the 'Nan' specials, was again made available aside the three specials from 2014 to 2015 under "Catherine Tate's Nan: The Specials", which was made available from 2Entertain on 18 January 2016.

Streaming
Available for streaming via Amazon Video:
 Nan's Christmas Carol
 Nan
 Nanger Management & Knees Up Wilmott-Brown

Feature film

References

2009 television specials
2014 television specials
2015 television specials